Bloomer was a name used to refer to three similar classes of 2-2-2 express passenger locomotives designed by James McConnell for the Southern Division of the London and North Western Railway (LNWR). A total of seventy-four were built between 1851 and 1862. The classes were similar in design and layout but differed in dimensions.

History
The name "Bloomer" was at first a nickname, but was quickly adopted officially. The nickname was a topical one in the autumn of 1851 when the first engine arrived on the line, because of the current popular excitement aroused by the appearance of women wearing trousers, as advocated by Mrs Amelia Bloomer. The widespread belief that they were awarded this nickname because they showed more of their wheels than earlier engines makes no sense: most earlier engines on the line had naked wheels.

Another enduring myth is that until 1862 the Bloomers (and other Southern Division engines) were painted vermilion. They were not, although some were painted a very dark plum-red from 1861, before the standard livery reverted to green in the following year, and then changed to black from 1873.

In April 1862, the Southern Division locomotives were renumbered into the all-LNWR series by the addition of 600 to each engine's number.

Apart from two of the 6 ft 6 in engines which were scrapped in 1866, all the Bloomers were given nameplates in 1872; the names awarded were of the usual miscellaneous variety customary on the LNWR.

(a) 7 ft driving wheel Bloomers ('Large Bloomers' from 1862)

The design of these was derived from six successful 2-2-2 locomotives supplied to the railway by Bury, Curtis and Kennedy in 1848. McConnell substituted plate frames, provided larger boilers and  driving wheels. The first twenty were built by Sharp, Stewart and Company in 1851–1853. A further twenty examples were built in 1861/2: five by Sharp Stewart & Co., five by Kitson and Company, and ten at the Wolverton railway works of the LNWR.

They were numbered 247–256, 287–296 and 389–408 until 1862, when they were renumbered by the addition of 600, becoming 847 to 1008.

The locomotives were primarily used on express passenger services between London and Birmingham and, from 1860, also from Rugby to Stafford.

During the 1860s and 1870s, most of the class were rebuilt with new (Crewe) boilers; the original 2,000 gallon tenders were reduced to hold 1,700 gallons because of the introduction of water troughs on the main line. Withdrawals took place between June 1876 and November 1888.

* Number assigned, but possibly never carried

(b) 6 ft 6 in driving wheels ('Small Bloomers')

Eleven smaller examples were built with  driving wheels in 1854 for use on secondary fast main-line trains and branch lines of the Southern Division. These engines were originally intended by McConnell to be a 7 ft-wheel variant of his Patent class, but the design was altered by order of the directors to a smaller version of the successful Bloomers. Like them, the design was closely based on the Bury, Curtis & Kennedy 6 ft single of 1848; McConnell called the Small Bloomer design 'Bury's Improved'.

Seven were built by R and W Hawthorn and four by Vulcan Foundry. A further twenty of this design were built at Wolverton Works between 1857 and 1861. Numbers originally carried were an assortment from 2 to 381, renumbered 602 to 981 in 1862. Two were withdrawn in 1866, but the others were rebuilt between 1868 and 1876; the last one was scrapped in 1887.

(c) 7 ft 6 in driving wheel(H-class 'Special Bloomers')
Three examples were built by Wolverton Works with  driving wheels together with McConnell’s patented firebox in 1861, which were intended for the fastest expresses. They were heavier than had been planned, so a further two engines, ordered and under construction, were cancelled in February 1862. This led to McConnell’s immediate resignation. The three completed engines (Nos. 372/3/5) went into store, so hardly ran in their original state. One of them (No. 373) was put on show at the 1862 International Exhibition in South Kensington from May to November 1862.

After rebuilding with normal boilers in 1866/7, they worked until withdrawal in 1880 and 1882. Many years later, they were described as "Extra-large Bloomers".

Replicas

An accurate full-size, non-working replica was built, by apprentices, for static display outside Milton Keynes station in 1991. It represented the type as in 1873–76 condition, was numbered '1009' as if to follow the last of the class, 1008, and was named 'Wolverton' to commemorate the Southern Division Works, although no engine was so named on the LNWR. It was taken into Wolverton Works (then owned by Alstom and later by Railcare) in 2006 for renovation and repainting. The renovation was funded and carried out by the various owners of Wolverton works and latterly by Knorr-Bremse RailServices at Wolverton Works. The Wolverton and Greenleys Town Council and the Wolverton Arts and Heritage Society wanted the replica to have a position on Stratford road outside the Railway works but this was not viable and led to much delay in the re-siting the model. On 3 March 2017, the replica was moved to its new home at Milton Keynes Museum.

A full-size working engine as in original Southern Division condition (pre-1862) was begun at Tyseley in 1986 and was 90% completed by 1990. It has never been finished; however, the LNWR Bloomer project was launched in June 2019 in order to complete the locomotive.

References

2-2-2 locomotives
Bloomer
Railway locomotives introduced in 1851
Standard gauge steam locomotives of Great Britain
Scrapped locomotives